North Shore Studios is a film company located in the North Vancouver, British Columbia.  Acquired by Bosa Developments in 2006, it was previously part of Lions Gate Entertainment and was then known as Lionsgate Studios.

There are 8 stages totaling 132,435 square feet ranging from 11,000 to 20,000 square feet as well as streetscape. There is also 100,000 square feet of office space.

Selected North Shore Studios' film and television productions

 Arrow
 Alcatraz
 Deadpool
 Big Eyes
 The Interview
 Jumanji
 Juno
 Godzilla
 I, Robot
 Tomorrowland
 Rocky IV
 Rise of The Planet of the Apes
 X2:X-Men United
 X-Men:The Last Stand
 Mission Impossible Ghost Protocol
 Man of Steel
 Twilight: New Moon
 Twilight: Breaking Dawn
 Apollo 18
 Marmaduke
 If I Stay
 This Means War
 Fantastic 4
 Secret Circle
 Level Up
 Falling Skies
 Psych
 Human Target
 V
 Tower Prep
 The Big Year
 Diary of a Wimpy Kid: Rodrick Rules
 Diary of a Wimpy Kid
 Battlestar Galactica
 Catwoman
 Dark Angel
 Elektra
 Ernest Rides Again
 Fifty Shades of Grey
 Final Destination 3
 Look Who's Talking Too
 The Final Cut
 The Fog
 Scary Movie 3
 Scary Movie 4
 The Sentinel
 Slam Dunk Ernest
 Tru Calling
 White Chicks
 Men in Trees
 The 4400
 The X Files
 Man About Town
 Kyle XY
 LOL: Laughing Out Loud
 Fifty Shades Darker
 iZombie
 The Mysterious Benedict Society (TV series)
 Nancy Drew (TV series)
 National Parks (pilot)

References

External links
 North Shore Studios 

Cinema of British Columbia
Film organizations in Canada
Canadian film studios
Organizations based in British Columbia
Companies based in North Vancouver